Giannis Milonogiannis (Greek: Γιάννης Μυλωνογιάννης) is a Greek comic book artist who was born in Maryland and grew up on the island of Crete, Greece. He first gained prominence in the American market with his English-language webcomic Old City Blues which was released in physical form by Archaia. From 2012 to 2016 he was one of the co-plotters and artists on Brandon Graham (comics)'s relaunch of Extreme Studios' Prophet.

Bibliography

Works in Greek
Roppongi #1-2 (zine, 2006)
Το Αίμα Που Κατουράω (w/a with Anastasia Tsiatsos, zine, 2008)

Works in English
Oceania-2 (w/a, webcomic, 2010)
Large Mobile Gun Force (w/a, webcomic, 2010)
Old City Blues (w/a, webcomic, 2010–...) collected as:
 Volume 1 (collects #1-4 + "Interrupt Handler" short story, hc, 120 pages, Archaia, 2011)
 Volume 2 (collects #5-10, tpb, 200 pages, Archaia, 2013)
Our Kind (w/a, a Batman fan/webcomic, 2010)
Aptera (w/a, unfinished webcomic, 2010)
Twisted Savage Dragon Funnies: "Wrong Turn" (a, with Paul Maybury, anthology, 128 pages, Image, 2011)
Prophet (w/a, with Brandon Graham, Simon Roy and various artists, Extreme Studios, 2012–2016) collected as:
 Remission (includes #25, tpb, 136 pages, 2012)
 Brothers (includes #27-28, 30-31 and 33, tpb, 172 pages, 2013)
 Empire (includes #35-38, tpb, 128 pages, 2014)
 Joining (includes #39-43, 45 and Strikefile #1-2, tpb, 168 pages, 2015)
 Earth War (includes Earth War #1 and 4-6, tpb, 168 pages, 2016)
Spera (a, with Josh Tierney, anthology graphic novels, Archaia):
 Volume 2: "Chapter One" (168 pages, 2013)
 Volume 3: "Steamed Horror" (short story, 176 pages, 2013)
 Ascension of the Starless: "Chapter One" (168 pages, 2014)
All-New Ultimates #7-9 (a, with Michel Fiffe, 2014) collected in Volume 2: No Gods, no Masters (tpb, 136 pages, 2015)
Pressure/Sensitivity: "Combat Robot Rhynie" (w/a, digital anthology, Wacom, 2015)
Tyr Wyrmwood: Dragon Hunter (a, with Nuno Xei, digital one-shot, Comixology, 2015)
IDW Publishing:
TMNT: Bebop & Rocksteady Destroy Everything #1-2 (a, with Ben Bates, Dustin Weaver and Sophie Campbell, 2016)
G.I. Joe: Revolution (a, with Aubrey Sitterson, one-shot, 2016)

Covers only
Prophet #24 (Image, 2012)
Revenger #2 (Square Peg, 2013)
Halogen #1 (Archaia, 2015)
Atomic Robo and the Ring of Fire #2 (IDW Publishing, 2015)
The Transformers vs. G.I. Joe #12 (IDW Publishing, 2016)
Judge Dredd v2 #6 (IDW Publishing, 2016)

References

External links
 

Giannis Milonogiannis on Bandcamp
Scribbles, a print-on-demand collection of short comics and art
INTERVIEW CORNER #59: Γιάννης Μυλωνογιάννης (in Greek)
Old City Blues: H Αθήνα του 2049 σαν μια cyberpunk δυστοπία (in Greek)

Living people
Greek comics artists
1988 births